To the Bottom of the Sea is the sixth studio album by Cuban American dark cabaret singer Voltaire. It was released in 2008, and would be the first album by Voltaire to be released through his then-newly-founded label Mars Needs Music (named after his son, Mars). It is a loose concept album, set in the fictional country of Vorutania.

Polish musician Julia Marcell would provide additional vocals for the duet "This Sea"; Voltaire would also cover a song by her, "Accordion Player", originally present in her 2007 EP Storm.

Voltaire's son Mars is among the ones who provided additional vocals for the track "Stakes and Torches (The Uprising of the Peasants)".

Franz Nicolay of The World/Inferno Friendship Society provided the accordions for the album, in his first collaboration with Voltaire.

A music video was made for the track "Happy Birthday (My Olde Friend)"; it would be Voltaire's first (and only so far) music video ever.

Background
"Coin-Operated Goy" is a cover/parody of The Dresden Dolls' "Coin-Operated Boy", originally written by Amanda Palmer and Brian Viglione.

Voltaire stated that he originally wrote "The Beast of Pirate's Bay" to entertain Mars and his friends during one of Mars' birthday parties, even though the version included in To the Bottom of the Sea was slightly modified; the original, unaltered version of the song would be included on the 2010 compilation Spooky Songs for Creepy Kids.

In his official YouTube channel, Voltaire disserts on the meanings of the album's songs and what inspired him to write them.

Track listing

Personnel
 Voltaire — vocals
 Matthew Goeke — cello
 Glenn Sorino — drums, additional vocals (track 3)
 Gregor Kitzis — violin
 Franz Nicolay — accordion
 Julia Marcell — additional vocals (track 7)
 Doe Deere — piano
 Johnny Kalsi — goblet drum
 Reut Regev — trombone
 Andy Navarro, Ian Danger, Jasper Vigil, Mars — additional vocals (track 3)

References

2008 albums
Voltaire (musician) albums
Concept albums